Ansar Majeed Khan Niazi is a Pakistani politician born on 23 September 1982 who was the Provincial Minister of Punjab for Labour and Human Resource, in office from 27 August 2018 till April 2022. He had been a member of the Provincial Assembly of the Punjab from August 2018 till January 2023.

Education
He has received master level education much likely B.B.A in early 2005

Political career

He was elected to the Provincial Assembly of the Punjab as a candidate of Pakistan Tehreek-e-Insaf from Constituency PP-78 (Sargodha-VII) in 2018 Pakistani general election.

On 27 August 2018, he was inducted into the provincial Punjab cabinet of Chief Minister Sardar Usman Buzdar and was appointed as Provincial Minister of Punjab for Labor and Human Resource. He is also an ex-officio Chairman Governing Body Punjab Employees Social Security Institution.

References

Living people
Punjab MPAs 2018–2023
Pakistan Tehreek-e-Insaf MPAs (Punjab)
Provincial ministers of Punjab
1990 births